Uthingo Management (Pty) Ltd was the operator of the South African National Lottery until March 2007. It was formed in 1996 to compete for this right amongst a total of three consortia bidding for the licence.  Uthingo is not tasked with the allocation of funds to beneficiary organisations, but is instead mandated to raise revenue for the National Lottery Distribution Trust Fund.

It is a fully Black Economic Empowerment compliant business, with 70% ownership locally, and the remaining 30% being owned by international players who provided the tools and knowledge to run a lottery effectively.

Uthingo lost the bid to renew its license as the lottery operator to Gidani after a legal battle and negotiations with the Ministry of Trade and Industry. During that period (March to October 2007) the South African National Lottery was suspended and the first Lotto draw after Gidani took over from Uthingo was on 13 October 2007.

External links 
 Uthingo homepage

Gambling companies of South Africa